A time limit is a narrow field of time by which an objective or task must be accomplished.

Time limit may also refer to:

 Time Limit (film), a 1957 drama film
 Time Limit (horse), an American Thoroughbred racehorse
 "Time Limit" (song), a 2000 R&B single by Hikaru Utada

See also 
 Bandlimiting